U Kyaw Hla Aung (16 August 1940 – 1 August 2021) was a Burmese lawyer and civil rights activist and member of the Rohingya community.

Early life 
Kyaw Hla Aung was born in Sittwe, capital of Rakhine State, Burma, British Raj, as the son of a government official. He grew up and obtained his education in Sittwe and began to work as a court clerk and stenographer in 1960. Motivated by the injustice he saw, he quit his job and started to train as a lawyer, graduating in 1982.

Activism 
In 1986, as the government of Myanmar began to confiscate the land of the Rohingya, Aung represented a group of Rohingya farmers, writing an appeal letter. In retaliation, he was detained and spent two years in prison in Rangoon. In the aftermath of the 1988 protests he could leave prison and returned to Sittwe. He co-founded the "National Democratic Party for Human Rights" and was selected as candidate for the elections in 1990. To prevent his candidacy, he was arrested again and sentenced to 14 years in prison. In 1997 he was released in the course of an amnesty, but was repeatedly arrested afterwards. His home was razed in the course of the Rohingya conflict and since 2018 he lived in the Thet Kae Pyin internment camp outside of Sittwe, where he was one of the camp leaders. 

The main goal of his activism has been to organize access to healthcare and education for the Rohingya community and raise the awareness about the conflict.

In 2018, Aung won the Aurora Prize for Awakening Humanity.

In 2019, he was listed in the Fortune magazine's list of "World's Greatest Leaders on rank 28. The Armenian post office dedicated a stamp to him in 2019.

Aung was married and had seven children.

Aung died in Botahtaung, Yangon, where he had moved from the refugee camp for health treatment.

References

External links 
 

1940 births
2021 deaths
Burmese Muslims
Burmese human rights activists
Minority rights activists
Burmese prisoners and detainees
Rohingya people
People from Sittwe